Many authors will use quotations from literature as the title for their works. This may be done as a conscious allusion to the themes of the older work or simply because the phrase seems memorable. The following is a partial list of book titles taken from literature.  It does not include phrases altered for parody.

References 

Titles
Book titles